Song Jae-Kun (Hangul: 송재근, Hanja: 宋在根) (born 15 February 1974) is a South Korean short track speed skater, who won a gold medal in the 5000 m relay at the 1992 Winter Olympics together with teammates Ki-Hoon Kim, Lee Joon-Ho and Moo Ji-Soo.

External links
Database Olympics

1974 births
Living people
South Korean male short track speed skaters
Short track speed skaters at the 1992 Winter Olympics
Olympic short track speed skaters of South Korea
Olympic gold medalists for South Korea
Dankook University alumni
Olympic medalists in short track speed skating
Medalists at the 1992 Winter Olympics
Asian Games medalists in short track speed skating
Short track speed skaters at the 1996 Asian Winter Games
Medalists at the 1996 Asian Winter Games
Asian Games silver medalists for South Korea
Asian Games bronze medalists for South Korea
Universiade bronze medalists for South Korea
Universiade medalists in short track speed skating
Competitors at the 1993 Winter Universiade
Competitors at the 1995 Winter Universiade
20th-century South Korean people